Captain Chesapeake was a morning and afternoon children's show on WBFF (channel 45) in Baltimore, Maryland hosted by George A. Lewis (November 24, 1926 – December 18, 2000 at Lutherville-Timonium, Maryland) who portrayed  "Captain Chesapeake". The show aired from April 1971 until 1990. Lewis hosted a similar show, Captain Pitt on WPTT (channel 22) in Pittsburgh, Pennsylvania (which is now WPNT and is owned and operated by Sinclair Broadcast Group, Inc., the same group that owns and operates Baltimore's WBFF). Lewis began his career as the children's host of the Steamboat Bill and Mr. Cartoon shows on WSAZ-TV in Huntington, West Virginia, from 1957 until 1970.  Lewis also acted as "Ghost Host" on WBFF's late night horror movie show, and did news on WBFF prior to 1988.

Children in Baltimore could become "crew members" on the show.

The Captain Chesapeake show began with the poem:
"A shipwrecked sailor found himself in a plight.  Lost at sea he was really a sight.  He swam and swam 'til he thought he'd die, when a wondrous sight appeared to his eye.  A derelict boat that saved his life and put an end to his watery strife."

The theme song was the Zez Confrey tune "Stumbling", as recorded by The Three Suns. This theme was played from a 33 rpm at 45 rpm speed.

Captain Chesapeake signed off each show with important advice for his young viewers, “Be somebody important, Be yourself!”

Characters on the Captain Chesapeake show 
 Captain Chesapeake
 Mondy (pronounced Moan-dee) the Sea Monster, a local version of the Loch Ness Monster, not to be confused with Chessie, a legendary sea monster of Chesapeake Bay. Mondy was played by longtime WBFF employee Jimmy Uhrin. During the early 1980s, Mondy was played by WBFF employee Anna Cosby. She also was the voice of Andrew Claws the Lion (Androcles and the Lion).
 Bruce the Bird
 Andrew Claws the Lion
 Little Mo'
 Missy the Mermaid
 Mandy the Mermaid

Cartoon Character Segments

See also 
Captain 20 on WDCA
List of local children's television series

References

External links 
 WBFF FAQ
 So long Captain Chesapeake (Obit)
 Profiled at CrabCityKidsTV.com
  A Few Minutes With Captain Chesapeake (Video)
  "Ghost Host" close and partial sign-off 1980s (Video)

Local children's television programming in the United States
Culture of Baltimore
Huntington, West Virginia
1971 American television series debuts
1990 American television series endings
1970s American children's television series
1980s American children's television series
1990s American children's television series
American television shows featuring puppetry